Berkovo is a village in the Klina municipality, Kosovo. It had a Serbian majority before the Kosovo war. As the village was destroyed, houses were looted and demolished. In 2008 there were some 40 Serbs from 33 families there.

Population
No census has been held in Kosovo since 1991, so modern population data is not available.

Notes

References

Villages in Klina
Serbian enclaves in Kosovo